Ricardo Alejandro Lamas (born May 21, 1982) is an American former professional mixed martial artist who competed in  Featherweight in the Ultimate Fighting Championship (UFC).

Background
Lamas' father is Cuban and his mother is Mexican. The flags of these two countries are often displayed on his clothing during his fights. His father was the leader of a Cuban resistance movement under Castro regime, eventually managing to hide in the Brazilian embassy in Cuba before escaping to the United States. Ricardo is the youngest of six brothers. He went to Hinsdale Central High School in Hinsdale, Illinois.

College wrestling
Lamas graduated with a degree in exercise science from Elmhurst College in 2005, where he was a member of the men's wrestling team and earned All-American honors at the NCAA Division III Men's Wrestling Championships at 157 lbs. During his collegiate wrestling career (2001–2005), he racked up over 100 wins. He was also a two-time CCIW Champion, and was named the CCIW's "Most Outstanding Wrestler" during the 2003–04 season. Lamas returned to Elmhurst after graduation to serve as the assistant men's wrestling coach.

Mixed martial arts career

ISCF - International Sport Combat Federation
Lamas won the ISCF North Central Regional Title on April 26, 2008 in Loves Park, Illinois, USA when he defeated Cal Ferry via Guillotine Choke at 4:50 of round 4.

World Extreme Cagefighting
Lamas made his WEC debut on March 1, 2009 at WEC 39 against IFL and WEC veteran Bart Palaszewski. Lamas took the fight with 4 days notice as he replaced an injured Rich Crunkilton.  Lamas controlled Palaszewski with superior wrestling and scored with excellent ground-and-pound to win a unanimous decision.

Lamas faced Danny Castillo on August 9, 2009 at WEC 42.  Lamas suffered his first defeat as Castillo won the fight via second-round TKO.

Lamas next faced James Krause on November 18, 2009 at WEC 44.  Lamas won the fight via unanimous decision.

Lamas then faced Bendy Casimir on March 6, 2010 at WEC 47. He won the fight in stunning fashion by defeating Casimir via flying knee KO in the first round.

Lamas defeated Dave Jansen via unanimous decision on August 18, 2010 at WEC 50.

Lamas was expected to face Maciej Jewtuszko on December 16, 2010 at WEC 53, but Jewtuszko had to withdraw as he suffered a broken hand during training.  Lamas instead faced Iuri Alcântara and lost via KO in the first round.

Ultimate Fighting Championship
In October 2010, World Extreme Cagefighting merged with the Ultimate Fighting Championship. As part of the merger, all WEC fighters were transferred to the UFC.

In his UFC debut, Lamas faced returning UFC veteran Matt Grice in a featherweight bout on June 26, 2011 at UFC on Versus 4. Lamas defeated Grice via TKO in the first round.

Lamas faced Cub Swanson on November 12, 2011 at UFC on Fox 1. Lamas won via second round submission after applying an arm-triangle choke, earning Submission of the Night honors.

Lamas was expected to face Dustin Poirier on February 4, 2012 at UFC 143, replacing an injured Erik Koch  However, Lamas ended up injured as well and was replaced by Max Holloway.

For his third UFC fight at featherweight, Lamas faced Hatsu Hioki on June 22, 2012 at UFC on FX: Maynard vs. Guida.  He defeated the heavily favored Hioki via unanimous decision.

Lamas was briefly linked to a December 2012 bout with Frankie Edgar, however the pairing was scrapped after Edgar was tabbed as a replacement for the injured Erik Koch and face José Aldo at UFC 153.

Lamas faced Erik Koch on January 26, 2013 at UFC on Fox 6. Lamas won via TKO in the second round.

Lamas was expected to face Chan Sung Jung on July 6, 2013 at UFC 162.  However, on June 14, it was announced that Jung had been pulled from the Lamas bout and would replace an injured Anthony Pettis to face José Aldo on August 3, 2013 at UFC 163.  As a result, Lamas was pulled from the event.

The title fight against José Aldo eventually took place on February 1, 2014 as the co-main event of UFC 169. It was revealed during the UFC countdown show that Lamas received his black belt in Brazilian jiu-jitsu during his training camp leading up to the bout. Lamas lost the fight via unanimous decision.

Lamas faced Hacran Dias on June 28, 2014 at UFC Fight Night 44.  Lamas won the fight by unanimous decision.

Lamas faced Dennis Bermudez on November 15, 2014 at UFC 180. After dropping Bermudez with a jab, Lamas was able to secure a guillotine choke and earn the first round submission victory.

Lamas faced Chad Mendes on April 4, 2015 in the main event at UFC Fight Night 63.  Mendes won the fight via TKO in the first round.

Lamas faced Diego Sanchez on November 21, 2015 at The Ultimate Fighter Latin America 2 Finale. He won the fight by unanimous decision.

Lamas next faced Max Holloway on June 4, 2016 at UFC 199. He lost the back and forth fight via unanimous decision.

Lamas was scheduled to face returning veteran B.J. Penn on October 15, 2016 at UFC Fight Night 97. However, on October 4, Penn pulled out of the fight citing an injury. In turn, the promotion announced on October 6 that they had cancelled the event entirely.

Lamas was quickly rescheduled and returned to face Charles Oliveira on November 5, 2016 at The Ultimate Fighter Latin America 3 Finale. The bout was contested at a catchweight of 155 lbs, as Oliveira missed weight by nearly 10 lbs. Lamas won the fight via submission in the second round and was awarded a Performance of the Night bonus.

Lamas was expected to face Chan Sung Jung on July 29, 2017 at UFC 214. However Jung pulled out of the fight in early June citing a knee injury. He was replaced by Jason Knight. Lamas won the fight by first-round TKO.

Lamas was scheduled to face José Aldo on December 16, 2017 at UFC on Fox: Lawler vs. dos Anjos. However, Aldo was pulled from the bout in favour of a rematch with Max Holloway two weeks earlier at UFC 218, replacing an injured Frankie Edgar. Lamas instead faced Josh Emmett. At the weigh ins, Emmett weighed in at 148.5 pounds, 2.5 pounds over the featherweight upper limit of 146 pounds and the bout proceeded at a catchweight. Emmett forfeited 20% of his purse to Lamas. Lamas lost the fight via knockout in the first round.

Lamas faced Mirsad Bektić on  June 9, 2018 at UFC 225. He lost the fight by split decision.

Lamas faced Darren Elkins on November 17, 2018 at UFC Fight Night 140. He won the fight via TKO in the third round. Shortly after the fight, Lamas revealed in a social media post that he had been fighting with a blood clot in his left leg and that he got blood thinning medication for the condition.

Lamas faced Calvin Kattar at UFC 238 on June 8, 2019. He lost the fight via knockout in the first round.

Lamas was scheduled to face Ryan Hall on May 2, 2020 at UFC Fight Night: Hermansson vs. Weidman. However, on April 9, Dana White, the president of UFC announced that this event was postponed to a future date The bout was rescheduled on August 29, 2020 at UFC Fight Night 175. However, Hall pulled out of the bout due to an undisclosed injury. Lamas instead faced promotional newcomer Bill Algeo. He won the fight via unanimous decision. This fight earned him the Fight of the Night award. Lamas confirmed his intention to retire from professional competition after the win over Algeo.

Personal life
Lamas and his wife have three children.

Championships and accomplishments

Amateur wrestling
 NCAA Division III All-American out of Elmhurst College (2005) NCAA Division III 157 lb: 6th place out of Elmhurst College (2005)
 CCIW two-time champion (2004–05) at 157 lb (out of Elmhurst College)

Mixed martial arts
 Ultimate Fighting Championship
 Performance of the Night (One time) 
 Submission of the Night (One time) 
Fight of the Night (One time)
 International Sport Combat Federation
 ISCF Lightweight Championship (One time)

Mixed martial arts record

|-
|Win
|align=center|20–8
|Bill Algeo
|Decision (unanimous)
|UFC Fight Night: Smith vs. Rakić
|
|align=center|3
|align=center|5:00
|Las Vegas, Nevada, United States
|
|-
|Loss
|align=center|19–8
|Calvin Kattar
|TKO (punches) 
|UFC 238 
|
|align=center|1
|align=center|4:06
|Chicago, Illinois, United States
|
|-
|Win
|align=center|19–7
|Darren Elkins
|TKO (elbows and punches)
|UFC Fight Night: Magny vs. Ponzinibbio 
|
|align=center|3
|align=center|4:09
|Buenos Aires, Argentina
| 
|-
|Loss
|align=center|18–7
|Mirsad Bektić
|Decision (split)
|UFC 225 
|
|align=center|3
|align=center|5:00
|Chicago, Illinois, United States
|
|- 
|Loss
|align=center|18–6
|Josh Emmett
|KO (punch)
|UFC on Fox: Lawler vs. dos Anjos 
|
|align=center|1
|align=center|4:33
|Winnipeg, Manitoba, Canada
|
|-
|Win
|align=center|18–5
|Jason Knight
|TKO (punches)
|UFC 214
|
|align=center|1
|align=center|4:34
|Anaheim, California, United States
|
|-
|Win
|align=center| 17–5
|Charles Oliveira
| Submission (guillotine choke)
|The Ultimate Fighter Latin America 3 Finale: dos Anjos vs. Ferguson
|
|align=center| 2
|align=center| 2:13
|Mexico City, Mexico
|
|-
|Loss
|align=center|16–5
|Max Holloway
|Decision (unanimous)
|UFC 199
|
|align=center|3
|align=center|5:00
|Inglewood, California, United States
|  
|-
|Win
|align=center|16–4
|Diego Sanchez 
|Decision (unanimous)
|The Ultimate Fighter Latin America 2 Finale: Magny vs. Gastelum
|
|align=center|3
|align=center|5:00
|Monterrey, Mexico
|  
|-
|Loss
|align=center|15–4
|Chad Mendes
|TKO (punches)
|UFC Fight Night: Mendes vs. Lamas
|
|align=center|1
|align=center|2:45
|Fairfax, Virginia, United States
|
|-
| Win
|align=center| 15–3
|Dennis Bermudez
| Submission (guillotine choke)
|UFC 180
|
|align=center| 1
|align=center|3:18
|Mexico City, Mexico
|
|-
| Win
|align=center| 14–3
| Hacran Dias
| Decision (unanimous)
| UFC Fight Night: Swanson vs. Stephens
| 
|align=center| 3
|align=center| 5:00
|San Antonio, Texas, United States
| 
|-
| Loss
|align=center| 13–3
| José Aldo
| Decision (unanimous)
| UFC 169
| 
|align=center| 5
|align=center| 5:00
|Newark, New Jersey, United States
| 
|-
| Win
|align=center| 13–2
| Erik Koch
| TKO (elbows)
| UFC on Fox: Johnson vs. Dodson
| 
|align=center| 2
|align=center| 2:32
|Chicago, Illinois, United States
|
|-
| Win
|align=center| 12–2
| Hatsu Hioki
| Decision (unanimous)
| UFC on FX: Maynard vs. Guida
| 
|align=center| 3
|align=center| 5:00
|Atlantic City, New Jersey, United States
|
|-
| Win
|align=center| 11–2
| Cub Swanson
| Submission (arm-triangle choke)
| UFC on Fox: Velasquez vs. dos Santos
| 
|align=center| 2
|align=center| 2:16
|Anaheim, California, United States
|
|-
| Win
|align=center| 10–2
| Matt Grice
| TKO (head kick and punches)
| UFC Live: Kongo vs. Barry
| 
|align=center| 1
|align=center| 4:41
|Pittsburgh, Pennsylvania, United States
|
|-
| Loss
|align=center| 9–2
| Iuri Alcântara
| KO (punches)
| WEC 53
| 
|align=center| 1
|align=center| 3:26
|Glendale, Arizona, United States
| 
|-
| Win
|align=center| 9–1
| Dave Jansen
| Decision (unanimous)
| WEC 50
| 
|align=center| 3
|align=center| 5:00
|Las Vegas, Nevada, United States
| 
|-
| Win
|align=center| 8–1
| Bendy Casimir
| KO (flying knee)
| WEC 47
| 
|align=center| 1
|align=center| 3:43
|Columbus, Ohio, United States
| 
|-
| Win
|align=center| 7–1
| James Krause
| Decision (unanimous)
| WEC 44
| 
|align=center| 3
|align=center| 5:00
|Las Vegas, Nevada, United States
| 
|-
| Loss
|align=center| 6–1
| Danny Castillo
| TKO (punches)
| WEC 42
| 
|align=center| 2
|align=center| 4:15
|Las Vegas, Nevada, United States
| 
|-
| Win
|align=center| 6–0
| Bart Palaszewski
| Decision (unanimous)
| WEC 39
| 
|align=center| 3
|align=center| 5:00
|Corpus Christi, Texas, United States
| 
|-
| Win
|align=center| 5–0
| Christopher Martins
| Decision (unanimous)
| IHC 12: Resurrection
| 
|align=center| 3
|align=center| 5:00
|Chicago, Illinois, United States
| 
|-
| Win
|align=center| 4–0
| Gabe Miranda
| TKO (punches) 
| Warriors Collide 6
| 
|align=center| 1
|align=center| 3:16
|Castle Rock, Colorado, United States
| 
|-
| Win
|align=center| 3–0
| James Birdsley
| Decision (unanimous)
| Warriors Collide 4
| 
|align=center| 2
|align=center| 5:00
|Cripple Creek, Colorado, United States
| 
|-
| Win
|align=center| 2–0
| Cal Ferry
| Submission (guillotine choke)
| ISCF: Rumble in the Park
| 
|align=center| 4
|align=center| 4:50
|Loves Park, Illinois, United States
|
|-
| Win
|align=center| 1–0
| Jake Corry
| Submission (guillotine choke)
| FCE: Collision
| 
|align=center| 1
|align=center| 1:49
|Northlake, Illinois, United States
| 
|-

See also
 List of current UFC fighters
 List of male mixed martial artists

References

External links

Living people
1982 births
American male mixed martial artists
Mixed martial artists from Illinois
American mixed martial artists of Mexican descent
American mixed martial artists of Cuban descent
Lightweight mixed martial artists
Mixed martial artists utilizing collegiate wrestling
Mixed martial artists utilizing Brazilian jiu-jitsu
People from Cook County, Illinois
Sportspeople from Chicago
American practitioners of Brazilian jiu-jitsu
People awarded a black belt in Brazilian jiu-jitsu
Elmhurst College alumni
Ultimate Fighting Championship male fighters